Emilio Diez Barroso is a Mexican-American businessman, best-selling author and philanthropist.  He is the Chairman and CEO of NALA Investments, a family office with operations across various industries including communications, transportation, consumer products, real estate, technology and media.

Biography

Diez Barroso is the great-grandson of Emilio Azcárraga Vidaurreta, founder of Mexico's Televisa network. He studied Economics and Finance at Harvard University, I.T.A.M. and Boston Universities, and has an M.A. in Psychology from the University of Santa Monica with an emphasis on Consciousness Health and Healing.

Diez Barroso has held senior-level positions and sat on the board of most NALA owned companies. He was Managing Director for Corporacion Triangulo, an investment corporation headquartered in Mexico and was named one of the 10 most powerful Latinos by  Poder Magazine, and by The Hollywood Reporter.

Emilio is a founding partner of Bold Capital Partners, an investment partnership formed with Peter Diamandis and Singularity University.
He currently chairs the board of The World is Just a Book Away, a non-profit organization empowering children to change their own lives and communities through books, libraries, and educational programs.   He is also on the board of LIFT, a national nonprofit dedicated to ending intergenerational poverty, of West Coast Care a nonprofit leading the way in reducing homelessness, and is a member of the X Prize Foundation's Innovation Board.  He is on the client advisory council for US Trust, Bank of America, and serves on the boards of UC San Diego Health, The University of Santa Monica,The UCLA School of Theater, Film and Television and the CrossRoads School for Arts and Sciences.  He is also on the board of UR Welcome and of GOOD Media Group.. In collaboration with Daniel Cordaro, Emilio co-founded The Contentment Foundation, which develops child and adult-centered curricula that supports individuals in recognizing their inherent wellbeing. Emilio is the author of the best selling book The Mystery Of You, Freedom is Closer Than you Think.

NALA Investments
In 1999, Emilio Diez Barroso founded NALA Investments ("North America Latin America"), and is currently its Chairman and CEO. It is a private investment holding company with operations across various industries including communications, energy, transportation, consumer products, real estate, technology and media, primarily in the United States and Latin America.

NALA Films

In 2005, Diez Barroso founded NALA Investments' production arm, NALA Films, that couples "Latin American talent, resources and incentives" and "English language motion pictures", and is based in Los Angeles. NALA Films' "has been producing and financing "two to five feature films per year."

See also
 Volaris
 Televisa
 Univision
 NALA Films
 Azcárraga family
 Singularity University
 xprize
 Bold Capital Partners
 Summit Entertainment

References

American chief executives
American company founders
Living people
Harvard University alumni
Boston University alumni
Year of birth missing (living people)
American people of Mexican descent
University of Santa Monica alumni
Instituto Tecnológico Autónomo de México alumni
American philanthropists